Espakeh (also Romanized as Aspakeh, Esfakeh, Isfakeh, and Ispakeh) is a city in and the capital of Lashar District, in Nik Shahr County, Sistan and Baluchestan Province, Iran. At the 2006 census, its population was 2,995, in 622 families.

References

Populated places in Nik Shahr County

Cities in Sistan and Baluchestan Province